Sujjan Singh (born 12 September 1980) is an Indian professional golfer.

He turned professional in 2005 and joined the Professional Golf Tour of India, where he has two wins. In 2011 he joined the Asian Tour, and finished 32nd in the Order of Merit in his debut season to retain his card.

Singh was married to Irina Brar, a former Indian number one ladies' golfer. The couple have been separated since 2018. He is a close friend of fellow professional golfer Gurbaaz Mann. The two even formed a band together, in which Singh played drums. Sujjan was educated at Bishop Cotton School (Shimla), a prestigious boarding school. In 1998, he was the School Captain.

Professional wins (3)

Asian Development Tour wins (1)

Professional Golf Tour of India wins (2)

References

External links

Indian male golfers
Asian Tour golfers
Sportspeople from Chandigarh
1980 births
Living people